"Quittin' Time" is a song written by Robb Royer and Roger Linn, and recorded by American country music artist Mary Chapin Carpenter.  It was released in January 1990 as the third single from the album State of the Heart.  The song reached No. 7 on the Billboard Hot Country Singles & Tracks chart.

Content
The song is about a relationship that has failed, with the narrator describing the end of the relationship as "quittin' time".

Critical reception
A review in Billboard was positive, stating that the song was "A spirited but rueful acknowledgment of love gone stale" and had a "clean, insistent instrumental sound" similar in concept to its predecessor, "Never Had It So Good".

Chart performance

Year-end charts

References

1990 singles
Mary Chapin Carpenter songs
Songs written by Robb Royer
Columbia Records singles
1989 songs